Far East Plaza is a shopping centre in Singapore, located in the heart of the Orchard Road shopping belt at Scotts Road. It opened in 1982 together with a Metro (clothing shop) that has since closed down.

Over the past few years, Far East Plaza has been a center for youth culture in Singapore with more than 600 shops. It houses many inexpensive clothing outlets as well as eateries which attract a young crowd. Far East Plaza is also home to numerous tattoo parlors and barbers which are mostly located on the upper floors. However, with the emergence of National Youth Council of Singapore's youth Scape center, as well as other youth oriented shopping malls springing up, such as Cathay Cineleisure, the number of youth that frequent Far East Plaza is on a decline.

Far East Plaza also houses 'Far East Plaza Residences' Serviced Apartments. The service residences consist of 139 apartments of various sizes.

References

Shopping malls in Singapore
Sino Group